Carlos Enrique Brito Benavides (12 November 18912 February 1943) was an Ecuadorian composer and pianist.

The son of musician Manuel Brito Cruz, he gained his early knowledge of music from his father and subsequently received private lessons with pianist and composer Sixto María Durán Cárdenas. He later joined the bands No. 3 Regiment Calderón, then the No. 1 Vencedores Battalion and these bands toured much of Ecuador. In Guayaquil in 1929, Brito Benavides won a prize in a contest with his group. He died in Quito, aged 51.

See also
List of Ecuadorian musicians

References
Ecuadorian Dictionary of Musicians

Ecuadorian pianists
Ecuadorian composers
1891 births
1943 deaths
People from Quito
20th-century composers
20th-century pianists